The phrase Novus ōrdō sēclōrum ("New order of the ages") is the second of two mottos added by the secretary of the Congress of the Confederation, Charles Thomson, on the reverse (the back side) of the Great Seal of the United States (the first motto is Annuit cœptis).

Origin and phrase meaning 
The phrase is a reference to the fourth Eclogue of Virgil, which contains a passage (lines 5-8) that reads:
 

The forms saecla, saeclorum etc. were normal alternatives to the more common saecula etc. throughout the history of Latin poetry and prose. The form saeculorum is impossible in hexameter verse: the ae and o are long, the u short by position.

The word seclorum does not mean "secular", but is the genitive (possessive) plural form of the word saeculum, meaning (in this context) generation, century, or age. Saeculum did come to mean "age, world" in late, Christian Latin, and "secular" is derived from it, through secularis. However, the adjective "secularis," meaning "worldly," is not equivalent to the genitive plural "seclorum," meaning "of the ages."

The motto Novus ordo seclorum was translated and added to the seal by Charles Thomson, a Latin expert who was involved in the design of the Great Seal, as "A new order of the ages." Thomson said it was to signify "the beginning of the new American Era" as of the date of the Declaration of Independence.

See also 

 Annuit cœptis
 E pluribus unum
 Eye of Providence
 New World Order (conspiracy theory)
 List of Latin phrases
 List of national mottos
 List of U.S. state and territory mottos
 United States national motto

References 

Latin mottos
National symbols of the United States